Canım Sana Feda is a 1965 Turkish romantic drama film, directed by Halit Refiğ and starring Cüneyt Arkın, Nilüfer Aydan, and Muzaffer Tema.

Cast 

 Cüneyt Arkın as Ahmet 
 Nilüfer Aydan as Türkan Ateş
 Muzaffer Tema
 Esen Püsküllü
 Tuncer Necmioğlu
 Nusret Özkaya
 Hüseyin Demir
 Cevdet Balıkçı
 Behçet Nacar
 İsmet Erten
 Muammer Gözalan

References

External links

1965 films
Turkish romantic drama films
1965 romantic drama films
Films directed by Halit Refiğ
1965 crime drama films
Turkish black-and-white films